Sam Bobrick (July 24, 1932 – October 11, 2019) was an American author, playwright, television writer, and lyricist.

Early life
Bobrick was born to a Jewish family in Chicago on July 24, 1932. His father was a storekeeper and his mother worked for the postal service. In 1950 he graduated from Benton Harbor High School in Michigan. After a three-year, nine-month, twenty-seven-day stint in the U.S. Air Force between 1951–1955, Bobrick attended the University of Illinois where he graduated with a degree in journalism.

Career
He began his career writing for the popular children's show Captain Kangaroo. He also wrote for such shows as The Andy Griffith Show, Bewitched, The Flintstones, Get Smart, The Kraft Music Hall, and The Smothers Brothers Comedy Hour. He created the short-lived Disney Channel TV series Good Morning, Miss Bliss, which was resurrected by NBC as the long-running hit show Saved By The Bell. He won three Writers Guild of America Awards for his television work and was nominated for an Emmy. He also wrote several movies and later quit writing for film and television in 1990.

Bobrick wrote over 40 plays. His first play, Norman, Is That You?, which he co-wrote with Ron Clark, opened on Broadway in the early 1970s. While a flop on Broadway, its West Coast premiere at the Ebony Showcase Theater in Los Angeles ran for seven years (1971-1978). The play also ran for five years in Paris (Pauvre France) and has played in over thirty countries around the world. Bobrick and Clark collaborated on three more Broadway plays, No Hard Feelings, Murder at the Howard Johnson's, and Wally's Cafe.

Bobrick's solo works included the plays, Remember Me? Getting Sara Married, Last Chance Romance, Hamlet II (Better Than The Original), New York Water, Passengers and The Crazy Time. He also wrote a number of mystery plays, among them Flemming, An American Thriller, The Spider Or The Fly, Death In England and A Little Bit Wicked. In 2011, his mystery play The Psychic won the Mystery Writers of America's coveted Edgar Award.

With his wife Julie Stein, he wrote two plays: Lenny's Back, about comedian Lenny Bruce, which was nominated for a Los Angeles Ovation Award, and The Outrageous Adventures of Sheldon & Mrs. Levine, an adaption of their book Sheldon & Mrs. Levine, which is performed worldwide.

Bobrick co-wrote the song The Girl of My Best Friend with Beverly Ross which was recorded by Elvis Presley and many other recording artists throughout the years, including Bryan Ferry. Another song, It Will Never Be Over For Me was recorded by the iconic Los Lobos. He also wrote two satirical albums for Mad, Mad Twists Rock n Roll and Fink Along With Mad. His most recent music endeavor was a CD entitled "Totally Twisted Country" that he co-wrote with his son Joey Bobrick for the band The Cow Pies.

Bobrick was a member of the Stage Directors and Choreographers Society, as well as the Dramatists Guild and Writers Guild of America. He directed many of his plays in regional theatres in the U.S. and Canada.

Death
Bobrick died on October 11, 2019, at age 87, shortly after suffering a stroke. He had a  wife, Julie, from a second marriage in 2000. His first marriage to Jeanne Johnson in 1963 ended in divorce in 1990. Bobrick also had three children.

References

External links
 
 
 
 

1932 births
2019 deaths
20th-century American dramatists and playwrights
20th-century American male writers
American lyricists
American male dramatists and playwrights
American male screenwriters
Edgar Award winners
Military personnel from Illinois
United States Air Force airmen
University of Illinois Urbana-Champaign College of Media alumni
Writers from Chicago
Writers Guild of America Award winners